James William "Bill" Pope, Jr. (February 2, 1938 – June 8, 2014) was an American lawyer and politician.

Born in Nashville, Tennessee, Pope went to the University of Tennessee and the Cumberland School of Law. He practiced law and worked for the Tennessee Valley Authority. Pope was also involved in the banking business. He served as mayor of Pikeville, Tennessee. In 1967, he served in the Tennessee House of Representatives as a Democrat. He died in Dayton, Tennessee.

Notes

External links
James William Pope, Jr.

1938 births
2014 deaths
Politicians from Nashville, Tennessee
People from Pikeville, Tennessee
University of Tennessee alumni
Cumberland School of Law alumni
Businesspeople from Tennessee
Tennessee lawyers
Mayors of places in Tennessee
Democratic Party members of the Tennessee House of Representatives
20th-century American businesspeople
20th-century American lawyers